Audacity is a free and open-source digital audio editor and recording application software, available for Windows, macOS, Linux, and other Unix-like operating systems. The project was started in the fall of 1999 by Dominic Mazzoni and Roger Dannenberg at Carnegie Mellon University, and released on May 28, 2000, as version 0.8.

As of December 6, 2022, Audacity is the most popular download at FossHub, with over 114.2 million downloads since March 2015. It was previously served from Google Code and SourceForge, where it was downloaded over 200 million times. 

Audacity won the SourceForge 2007 and 2009 Community Choice Award for Best Project for Multimedia. It is licensed under GPL-2.0-or-later.

In 2019, then-lead developer James Crook started the fork DarkAudacity to experiment with a new look and other UX changes. Most of its changes were eventually incorporated into the mainline version and the fork ended.

In April 2021, it was announced that Muse Group (owners of MuseScore and Ultimate Guitar) would  acquire the Audacity trademark and continue to develop the application, which remains free and open source.

Features and use
In addition to recording audio from multiple sources, Audacity can be used for post-processing of all types of audio, including effects such as normalization, trimming, and fading in and out. It has been used to record and mix entire albums, such as by Tune-Yards. It is currently used in the Sound Creation unit of the UK OCR National Level 2 ICT course.

Audacity's features include:
 Recording and playing back sounds
 Timer Record – schedule when a recording begins and ends, for unattended recording
 Punch and Roll recording – for editing on-the-fly (version 2.3.0 on)
 Scrubbing (audio) (Version 2.1.1 and later) 
 MIDI playback (version 2.2.0 on)
 Editing 
 Via cut, copy, and paste, with unlimited Undo levels
 Smart clips (version 3.2.0 on) Non-destructive trimming (and un-trimming) of audio clips
 Real-time effects (version 3.2.0 on) Non-destructive and destructive effect processing.
 Multi-track features including navigation controls, zoom and single-track edit, project pane and XY project navigation.
 Amplitude envelope editing
 Precise adjustments to speed (tempo) while maintaining pitch, to synchronize audio with video or for precise running time
 Conversion of records, tapes or MiniDiscs to digital tracks by splitting the audio source into multiple tracks based on silences in the source material
 Cross-platform operation – versions for Windows, macOS (Intel, ARM and Universal builds) and Unix-like systems (including Linux and BSD). 
It uses the wxWidgets software library for a similar graphical user interface on various operating systems.
 Large array of digital effects and plug-ins. Additional effects can be written with Nyquist, a Lisp dialect.
 Built-in LADSPA, VST and Nyquist plug-in support
 Noise Reduction based on sampling the noise to be minimized
 Vocal Reduction and Isolation for creation of karaoke tracks and isolated vocal tracks
 Pitch adjustment maintaining speed, and speed adjustment maintaining pitch
 Saving and loading user presets for effect settings across sessions (version 2.1.0 on)
 Support for multi-channel modes with sampling rates up to 96 kHz with 32 bits per sample
 Audio spectrum analysis using the Fourier transform algorithm
 Importing and exporting WAV, AIFF, MP3 (via LAME encoder, now integrated), Ogg Vorbis, and all file formats supported by libsndfile library. 
Version 1.3.2 and later supported Free Lossless Audio Codec (FLAC). 
Version 1.3.6 and later also supported additional formats such as WMA, AAC, AMR and AC3 via the optional FFmpeg library.
 Detection of dropout errors while recording with an overburdened CPU
 From 2.3.2 on, a mod-script-pipe for driving Audacity from Python (can be enabled in Preferences)
 Full online user manual for the application, 
 Four user-selectable visual themes (version 2.2.0 on)
 Four user-selectable colorways for waveform display in audio tracks (version 2.2.1 on)

Audacity supports the LV2 open standard for plugins, and can therefore load software like Calf Studio Gear.

The version 3.0 update (March 2021) introduced a new project file format, .aup3, using an SQLite database to store each project in a single database file.

The version 3.0.3 update (July 2021) introduced crash reporting and error reporting for database errors; optional update checking was also added.

The version 3.1.0 update (October 2021) introduced clip handles, smart clips and playback looping.

In April 2022, an official Audacity app was added to the Microsoft Store.

The version 3.2.0 update (September 2022) added real-time effects, VST3 support and a streamlined interface.

Limitations
Audacity does not natively import or export WMA, AAC, AC3 or most other proprietary or restricted file formats; rather, an optional FFmpeg library is required.
Audacity does not support instrument VST (VSTi) plugins. 
There are no real-time track equalizers or other real-time effect slots for recording, only playback.

Language support
In addition to English, Audacity is available in Afrikaans, Arabic, Basque, Bulgarian, Catalan, Chinese (simplified), Chinese (traditional), Corsican, Czech, Danish, Dutch, Finnish, French, Galician, German, Greek, Hungarian, Irish, Italian, Japanese, Lithuanian, Macedonian, Marathi, Norwegian (Bokmål), Polish, Portuguese (Brazilian), Romanian, Russian, Slovak, Slovenian, Spanish, Swedish, Turkish, Ukrainian, Vietnamese and Welsh. 

The documentation, the Audacity Manual, is available only in English.  The Audacity Forum offers technical support in Spanish, French, Russian and German.

Architecture

The diagram illustrates Audacity's layers and modules. Note the three important classes within wxWidgets, each of which has a reflection in Audacity.  

Higher-level abstractions result from related lower-level ones. For example, the BlockFile system is a reflection of and is built on wxWidgets' wxFiles. Lower down in the diagram is a narrow strip for platform-specific implementation layers. 

Both wxWidgets and PortAudio are OS abstraction layers, containing conditional code that chooses different implementations depending on the target platform.

Reception
As free and open-source software, Audacity is very popular in education, encouraging its developers to make the user interface easier for students and teachers.

Jamie Lendino of PC Magazine recently rated it 4/5 stars Excellent and said, "If you're looking to get started in podcasting or recording music, it's tough to go wrong with Audacity. A powerful, free, open-source audio editor that's been available for years, Audacity is still the go-to choice for quick-and-dirty audio work."

CNET rated Audacity 5/5 stars, calling it "feature-rich and flexible". Preston Gralla of PC World said, "If you're interested in creating, editing, and mixing you'll want Audacity." Jack Wallen of Tech Republic praised its features and ease-of-use. 

In The Art of Unix Programming (2003), open-source software advocate Eric S. Raymond wrote of Audacity, "The central virtue of this program is that it has a superbly transparent and natural user interface, one that erects as few barriers between the user and the sound file as possible."

Some reviewers and users have criticized Audacity for its inconvenient UX design, unsightly GUI and comparative lack of features compared with Adobe Audition. Matthew McLean wrote "Audacity looks a bit more dated and basic, but this will be appealing to many folks who’re just starting out".

In May 2021, after the project was acquired by Muse Group, there was a draft proposal to add opt-in telemetry to the code to record application usage. Some users responded negatively, with accusations of turning Audacity into spyware and also violating the GPL by adding an age restriction.  The company reversed course, falling back to error/crash reporting and optional update checking instead.
 Another controversy in July 2021 resulted from a change to the privacy policy which said that although personal data was stored on servers in the European Economic Area, the program would "occasionally [be] required to share your personal data with our main office in Russia and our external counsel in the USA". That July, the Audacity team apologized for the changes to the privacy policy and removed mention of the data storage provision which was added "out of an abundance of caution."

See also

 Comparison of free software for audio
 List of Linux audio software
 Multitrack recording

References

Notes

Sources
 James Crook, Amy Brown, Greg Wilson - The Architecture of Open Source Applications - Chapter 2 Audacity, released 2012 under CC BY 3.0 (open access).

External links

 
 Audacity platform and operating system version compatibility

2000 software
Audio editing software for Linux
Cross-platform free software
Free audio editors
Free music software
Free software programmed in C
Free software programmed in C++
MacOS multimedia software
Podcasting software
Software that uses FFmpeg
Software that uses wxWidgets
Software using the GPL license
Software that uses SQLite